The 12533 / 12534 Pushpak Express is an express train belonging to Indian Railways that runs between  and Mumbai in India. It operates as train number 12533 from Lucknow Junction to Mumbai CSMT and as train number 12534 in the reverse direction.

It is named after the mythological flying chariot Pushpak which is mentioned as the chariot of Ravana.

Service

The 12533/12534 Pushpak Express covers the distance of 1426 kilometres in 24 hours 20 mins (58.60 km/hr) and 1428 km in 24 hours 20 mins as 12534 Pushpak Express (58.68 km/hr).

As the average speed of the train is more than 55 km/hr, its fare includes a Superfast surcharge.

Locomotive 

Prior to June 2014, it was hauled by 3 locomotives during its journey.
	
With progressive electrification of the Lucknow–Jhansi sector, Bhusawal-based WAP-4 began hauling the train until from Lucknow Junction to Igatpuri, following which a WCAM-3 took over for the remainder of the journey until Mumbai CSMT.

With Central Railway completing the changeover of 1500 V DC traction to 25 kV AC traction on 6 June 2015, the train was to hauled by WAP-4 but from 2016, this train is now end to end hauled by Ajni-based WAP-7 locomotive .

Coaches
As with most train services in India, coach composition may be amended at the discretion of Indian Railways depending on demand.Now from 30 October 2021 this train has been upgraded to new brand LHB coach up & down.

 SLR consists of Luggage coach
 Gen consists of Unreserved coaches
 HA consists of First Class AC 2 Tier coach
 A consists of AC 2 Tier coach
 B consists of AC 3 Tier coach
 S consists of Non-AC Sleeper coach

Routing 

See also
Bandra Terminus–Lucknow Weekly Express
Pune–Lucknow Express

References 

 
 
 
 http://economictimes.indiatimes.com/industry/transportation/railways/dc-to-ac-conversion-on-mumbais-central-railways-rail-route-completed/articleshow/47582271.cms

External links
 

Passenger trains originating from Lucknow
Transport in Mumbai
Named passenger trains of India
Rail transport in Maharashtra
Rail transport in Madhya Pradesh
Express trains in India